BUMC may refer to:

Organizations
Banner University Medical Center, also known as Banner - University Medical Center Tucson (BUMCT), formerly University Medical Center and the University of Arizona Medical Center
Baylor University Medical Center, part of Baylor Scott & White Health, is a not-for-profit hospital in Dallas, Texas
Boston University Medical Campus, one of the two campuses of Boston University
Boston University Medical Center, consortium of Boston University, via its Boston University School of Medicine, and Boston Medical Center